Belize competed at the 2018 Commonwealth Games in the Gold Coast, Australia from April 4 to April 15, 2018. It was Belize's 10th appearance at the Commonwealth Games.

The Belize team consisted of 12 athletes (nine men and three women) that competed in four sports.

Cyclist Alicia Thompson was the country's flag bearer during the opening ceremony.

Competitors
The following is the list of number of competitors participating at the Games per sport/discipline.

Athletics (track and field)

Belize entered four athletes (two per gender).

Men
Track & road events

Field events

Women
Track & road events

 
Combined events – Heptathlon

Cycling

Belize participated with 4 athletes (3 men and 1 woman).

Road
Men

Women

Table tennis

Belize participated with 3 athletes (3 men).

Singles

Doubles

Team

Triathlon

Belize participated with 1 athlete (1 man).

Individual

See also
Belize at the 2018 Summer Youth Olympics

References

Nations at the 2018 Commonwealth Games
Belize at the Commonwealth Games
2018 in Belizean sport